Bobby Robinson may refer to:

Bobby Robinson (baseball) (1903–2002), Negro league baseball player
Bobby Robinson (record producer) (1917–2011), American independent record producer
Bobby Robinson (footballer, born 1950) (1950–1996), Scottish football midfielder
Bobby Robinson (footballer, born 1921) (1921–1975), English football goalkeeper

See also
Robert Robinson (disambiguation)
Robbie Robinson (disambiguation)